Babajide Olusola Sanwo-Olu (born 25 June 1965) is a Nigerian politician who has served as the governor of Lagos State since 2019. 

He became governor under the platform of the All Progressives Congress after contesting and unexpectedly winning the APC gubernatorial primaries against incumbent governor Akinwunmi Ambode in October 2018. He is a graduate of the University of Lagos, London Business School, Lagos Business School and the John F. Kennedy School of Government. Before his gubernatorial ambition, he was the managing director and CEO of Lagos State Property Development Corporation (LSPDC).

Education 
Sanwo-Olu briefly attended Government Demonstration School, Gbaja Surulere before moving to Ijebu-Ife Grammar School, Ogun State to complete his secondary education. He has a BSc in Surveying and an MBA from the University of Lagos. He is an alumnus of the John F. Kennedy School of Government, the London Business School and the Lagos Business School.

He is an associate member of the Chartered Institute of Personnel Management (CIPM) and fellow of the Nigeria Institute of Training and Development (NITAD).

Career

Banking 
Babajide Olusola Sanwo-Olu was the treasurer at former Lead Merchant Bank from 1994 to 1997 after which he moved to the United Bank for Africa as the head of foreign money market. He then proceeded to First Inland Bank, Plc (now First City Monument Bank) as a deputy general manager and divisional head. He was the chairman of Baywatch Group Limited and First Class Group Limited.

Public service 
Babajide Olusola Sanwo-Olu began his political career in 2003, when he was appointed a Special Adviser on Corporate Matters to the then deputy governor of Lagos State, Femi Pedro.
He was later made the acting Commissioner for Economic Planning and Budget until 2007, when he was appointed as the Commissioner for Commerce and Industry by then Governor, Bola Tinubu. After the General Elections of 2007, Babajide Olusola Sanwo-Olu was appointed Commissioner for Establishments, Training and Pensions by Governor Babatunde Fashola. Babajide Olusola Sanwo-Olu was made Managing Director/CEO of the Lagos State Development and Property Corporation (LSDPC) by Governor Akinwunmi Ambode in 2016.

Some of his notable public sector achievements include the supervision of the Bureau of Public Enterprises (BPE) privatization projects. He set up and was the Pioneer Board Chairman of Lagos Security Trust Fund. The LAGBUS System and the Control & Command Centre in Alausa Ikeja were subsequently established under his directives.

Politics 
On 16 September 2018, Babajide Olusola Sanwo-Olu formally declared his intention to run for the office of the governor of Lagos State under the platform of the All Progressives Congress (APC) making him a major contender to the incumbent governor Akinwunmi Ambode.

His declaration attracted endorsements from major stakeholders in Lagos State politics; including the Governor’s Advisory Council of the Lagos chapter of the All Progressives Congress and members of the Lagos State House of Assembly, which led to withdrawal of Dr. Obafemi Hamzat, a governorship aspirant on the platform of the All Progressives Congress APC in Lagos from the gubernatorial race.

He won the Lagos gubernatorial primaries of the All Progressives Congress (APC) on 2 October 2018. At the APC flag-off campaign rally held on 8 January 2019, Governor of Lagos, Akinwunmi Ambode, and 63 political parties lent their support for the candidacy of Mr Babajide Sanwo-Olu. In a landslide victory over his opponent, Jimi Agbaje, Sanwo-Olu was elected to the Office of Governor of Lagos State at the 2019 General elections for Lagos State which held on 9 March 2019. He was sworn in as the 15th Governor of Lagos State at the Tafawa Balewa Square (TBS) Lagos Island on Wednesday 29 May 2019.

He has been working on different development activities, one of which is road construction across major areas in Lagos state. Recently, Sanwo-olu asked that the statue of Fela Kuti that was erected by Akinwunmi Ambode be removed from Allen Avenue in Ikeja as he to ease the situation of traffic in that area. However, the statue is said to be relocated to a more convenient area in Lagos state. The Governor commissioned the Oshodi - Abule-Egba BRT Lane amongst other projects in 2020.

Awards 

Babajide Olusola Sanwo-Olu has obtained a variety of awards in his career, some of which include:

 Platinum award from the Lagos State Public Service Club.
 2009 Best in Human Capital Development award from the Industrial Training Fund (ITF).
 Merit award from the Association of National Accountants of Nigeria.
Merit award from the Chartered Institute of Personnel Management in Nigeria (CIPMN).
 Merit Award from the Association of Professional Women Engineers of Nigeria (APWEN).
LSDPC Impactful Leadership and Recognition Award.
 Media Nite-Out Award for Best Governor of the Year (2020).

Personal life 
Babajide Olusola Sanwo-Olu is married to Ibijoke Sanwo-Olu.

See also

List of Yoruba people
List of Governors of Lagos State

References 

Politicians from Lagos
1965 births
Living people
Yoruba politicians
University of Lagos alumni
Governors of Lagos State
Harvard Kennedy School alumni
Alumni of London Business School
All Progressives Congress politicians
People from Lagos State
Nigerian Pentecostals
Lagos Business School alumni